Alexandra Bridge
 Astoria–Megler Bridge
 Battersea Bridge
 Bolte Bridge
 Bridge of the Gods (modern structure)
 Carquinez Bridge
 Champlain Bridge
 Commodore Barry Bridge - 
 Conde McCullough Memorial Bridge
 Crescent City Connection - 
 Forth Bridge -  cantilever span
 George Washington Memorial Bridge
 Gramercy Bridge
 Hawk Street Viaduct -  demolished in 1970
 Howrah Bridge
 Huey P. Long Bridge (Baton Rouge)
 Huey P. Long Bridge (Jefferson Parish)
 Ironworkers Memorial Second Narrows Bridge - collapsed in 1958
 Jamestown Bridge - replaced in 1992, demolished in 2006
 Jacques Cartier Bridge
 Lewis and Clark Bridge
 Marquam Bridge
 Million Dollar Bridge
 Newburgh-Beacon Bridge -  cantilever span
 Pulaski Skyway
 Quebec Bridge -  cantilever span
 Queensboro Bridge
 Rainbow Bridge (Texas) -   main span
 Richmond–San Rafael Bridge
 San Francisco–Oakland Bay Bridge
 Sea Cliff Bridge
 Seongsu Bridge - collapsed in 1994, rebuilt in 1997
 Sunshine Skyway Bridge (old bridge)
 Tappan Zee Bridge -   cantilever span - replaced in 2017
 Tobin Bridge

Cantilever bridges